The Professional Rapid Online Chess League (PRO Chess League and abbreviated PCL) is an online rapid chess league operated by chess.com. It was preceded by the United States Chess League, which announced in 2016 that it would be renamed, reformatted, and opened to cities from around the world, and moved to the website chess.com.

In its inaugural season, the PCL comprised 48 teams, whose members included some of the highest-rated chess players in the world, including the reigning world champion Magnus Carlsen, and other elite players including Maxime Vachier-Lagrave, Hikaru Nakamura, and Wesley So plus over 100 other grandmasters. The 48 teams represent cities in five continents.

Teams

Format

 For each match, teams may have at least one free agent in the lineup
 The average rating of the four players in each match must be under 2500 
 Each match uses a scheveningen system with the first team to reach 8.5 points or higher winning. Time control is 15 minutes plus a 2 second increment per move.

For more information on the rules, see the following link

History

2017–present 
The first season started on January 11, 2017 and ended March 26, 2017. 48 teams participated, twelve of which had previously participated in the USCL. After the end of the first season, the St. Louis Arch Bishops defeated the Norway Gnomes, thus securing their first title. Wesley So won MVP. The PCL has a total prize fund of $50,000 compared to a prize fund of $10,000 in the USCL. In its second season, Greg Shahade introduced and new qualifications to join the league and an All-Star Game.

Championship history

Critic response 
Supporters say the league's worldwide distribution, the prize money, and the participation of many of the world's top-rated players may create a new level of competition and awareness for the game. It is anticipated that the new formats are leading to a "rise in popularity of online and rapid chess". In addition, the PCL has the potential to dramatically change chess culture and could lead to corporate sponsorships. This change from an "individual and slow game," to a relatively quick and team format, has made the offering more viewer friendly.

In a 2017 article, Greg Shahade made a similar statement to what Eric Rosen mentioned. Shahade talked about the league featuring worldwide team competition, using the scheveningen system which gives lower rated players the chance to pull upset each week, and having the chance to "revolutionize chess".

In an article written by ESPN, Viswanathan Anand spoke about how convenient it was to play online compared to playing over-the-board.

References

Chess organizations
2017 in chess
2017 establishments in the United States
Sports leagues established in 2017